Beaver Dam Pond is located northeast of Stillwater, New York. The outflow creek flows into Witchhopple Lake. Fish species present in the lake are brown bullhead, and yellow perch. Access via bushwhack trail from Salmon Lake or Witchhopple Lake. No motors are allowed on Beaver Dam Pond.

References

Lakes of Herkimer County, New York